Christopher James Dijak (born April 23, 1987) is an American professional wrestler currently signed to WWE, where he performs on the NXT brand under the mononymous ring name Dijak.

Dijak began his professional wrestling career in 2013 under the ring name Donovan Dijak, working in several promotions on the independent circuit, most notably for Chaotic Wrestling, where he trained. In 2014, he signed a contract with Ring of Honor (ROH), where he won the 2015 Top Prospect Tournament. After leaving ROH in 2017, he signed a contract with WWE. He was assigned to their NXT brand under the ring name of Dominik Dijakovic. In September 2020, he made his main roster debut as part of the Retribution faction under the ring name T-Bar. Although Retribution disbanded in March 2021, he continued teaming with fellow member Mace until he was drafted to the SmackDown brand in the 2021 WWE Draft. In November 2022, he returned to the NXT brand as Dijak.

Early life
Christopher James Dijak was born and raised in Lunenburg, Massachusetts. Dijak is of Croatian, Italian, and Hungarian ancestry. He was a standout three-sport athlete at Lunenburg High School, excelling specifically at football, resulting in him being recruited by many top New England area college football programs. Dijak was named the 2005 Sentinel & Enterprise Male Scholar Athlete of the Year, a Central Massachusetts Shriners All-Star selection, and was named a captain and selected as the team MVP during his senior season. Ultimately, Dijak accepted a scholarship to play college football for the UMass Minutemen.

After redshirting his freshman season at UMass and struggling to adjust at the large campus, Dijak ultimately decided to transfer to Bridgewater State University, a mid-sized liberal arts college located approximately 20 miles outside Boston, Massachusetts. At Bridgewater State, Dijak excelled at both football and basketball, leading the football team in both tackles and sacks in his junior and senior years, and led the basketball team in rebounding his senior year. Dijak also earned all-league honors in both sports. He was also named to the NCAA Division III Football East Region All-American team in his senior season playing for the Bears. Dijak graduated from Bridgewater State in 2010 with a bachelor's degree in Criminal Justice.

Professional wrestling career

Chaotic Wrestling (2013–2017)
Following two losses in smaller promotions, Dijak joined Chaotic Wrestling, training under Brian Fury and Todd Hanson. He made his debut in August 2013 in a winning effort against Vern Vicallo, and remained undefeated until July 2014 when he lost to Chaotic Wrestling champion Mark Shurman. After earning another title shot in a fatal four-way match the next month, he went on to defeat Shurman in their rematch on October 24 and claim the CW Heavyweight Championship. After a reign of 148 days, he lost the title against Chase Del Monte on March 21, 2015. In 2016, Dijak teamed with Mikey Webb to form the tag team The American Destroyers. Dijak and Webb would go on to win the Chaotic Wrestling Tag Team Championship by defeating The Logan Brothers on December 26, 2016, before losing them less than a month later to The Mill City Hooligans. In his final match for the promotion, Dijak defeated Christian Casanova and Josh Briggs in a triple threat match for the Chaotic Wrestling New England Championship. Immediately after the match, he vacated the title.

Ring of Honor (2014–2017)

He made his debut in Ring of Honor on July 27 at Future of Honor 2, first defeating Stokely Hathaway and then falling in defeat to Moose. Dijak won the 2015 Top Prospect Tournament, defeating Will Ferrara in the finals. This victory allowed him to face Jay Lethal for the ROH World Television Championship. However, he refused to take this opportunity and instead joined Truth Martini's The House of Truth, establishing himself as a heel. His first match as a member of the House of Truth took place on March 7, teaming with J Diesel and beating the team of Brutal Burgers (Bob Evans and Cheeseburger). On June 19, at Best in the World 2015, he wrestled against Mark Briscoe on a losing effort. He managed to win his next pay-per-view match against Takaaki Watanabe at Death Before Dishonor XIII.

On December 19 (aired January 13, 2016), he was banned from Truth Martini's stable, initially turning face in the process. At the February 27 ROH TV tapings, Dijak came out with Prince Nana and attacked Truth Martini, turning heel again and making a rare double-turn with Jay Lethal and becoming Prince Nana's latest crown jewel in the Embassy stable. Dijak announced his departure from ROH via Twitter on February 12, 2017.

WWE

NXT (2017–2020) 
In January 2017, WWE pulled a contract offer from Dijak, following a legal threat from ROH, who still had him under contract. The following month, Dijak opted not to re-sign with ROH, essentially putting his career on hold, waiting for another contract offer from WWE. On July 20, it was reported that Dijak was finishing up his independent bookings ahead of joining WWE. Dijak reported to the WWE Performance Center on August 21. His signing was announced by the company on September 5.

Dijak made his debut for WWE's developmental branch, NXT, on September 23. His television debut, under his real name, came on May 30, 2018, in a loss against Ricochet. In July 2018, WWE revealed Dijak's new ring name as Dominik Dijakovic. Promos started to appear on the December 5, 2018 episode of NXT, promoting the debut of Dominik Dijakovic. Dijakovic made his debut as a villain on the December 19 episode of NXT, defeating Aaron Mackey. Following WrestleMania 35, he was set to feud with then NXT North American Champion Velveteen Dream over the championship. However, in April 2019, he suffered a torn meniscus that would require surgery. He would be out of action until late July, when he returned at an NXT live event.

On November 13, 2019 episode of NXT, Dijakovic turned face when he joined Team Ciampa for the annual WarGames match with Tommaso Ciampa, Matt Riddle and Keith Lee against The Undisputed Era at TakeOver: WarGames. Riddle proceeded to leave the team to pursue his rivalry with Finn Bálor. At the event, Dijakovic and Team Ciampa defeated The Undisputed Era, with Riddle's place being taken by Kevin Owens. On the January 29, 2020 episode of NXT, Dijakovic defeated Damian Priest to become the number one contender for Keith Lee's NXT North American Championship at NXT TakeOver: Portland on February 16, where he failed to win the title. After the match, Lee and Dijakovic shook hands as a sign of respect. After Lee's NXT Championship win against Adam Cole at NXT: The Great American Bash, Dijakovic was challenged by Lee for both the NXT Championship and NXT North American Championship on the following episode, but was unsuccessful in capturing the titles. He was then attacked by Karrion Kross during a backstage interview, resulting in a match between the two on the July 22 episode of NXT, which Dijakovic lost. This marked his final appearance on NXT.

Raw (2020–2022) 
On the September 21 episode of Raw, he was revealed as a member of the villainous stable Retribution, under the ring name T-Bar, with a new outfit and a mask. On the October 5 episode of Raw, Mustafa Ali was revealed as the stable's leader. Over the following weeks, the faction had little success. At Fastlane on March 21, 2021, T-Bar and Mace attacked Ali, disbanding the stable. On the April 12 episode of Raw, T-Bar and Mace attacked Drew McIntyre, showing signs of joining The Hurt Business. The following week on Raw , T-Bar was finally unmasked along with Mace in a tag team match against McIntyre and Braun Strowman, in which T-Bar and Mace won by disqualification. Later in an interview, they confirmed the start of their tag team run. After a few weeks of absence from television, T-Bar and Mace were put as lumberjacks in a Lumberjack match between John Morrison and Damian Priest on the May 17 episode of Raw. 

As part of the 2021 Draft, Mace was drafted to the SmackDown brand while T-Bar remained on the Raw brand, thus disbanding the team. On the October 25 episode of Raw, T-Bar got himself disqualified in a match against WWE United States Champion Damian Priest after throwing an office chair at the champion. On the November 1 episode of Raw, he lost to Priest in a no disqualification match in which Priest retained the US title. Throughout 2022, he was relegated to competing on WWE Main Event until October.

Return to  NXT (2022–present) 
In the  October 25 episode of NXT, a vignette was shown of T-Bar's Retribution mask being tossed into a fire, teasing his return to the NXT brand. On the November 22 episode of NXT, he returned to the brand using his Dijak name and attacked Wes Lee after Wes successfully defended the NXT North American Championship against Carmelo Hayes. At NXT Vengeance Day, Dijak lost his North American Championship match due to interference from Tony D'Angelo and fellow NXT superstar “Stacks” Channing Lorenzo, thus giving Wes Lee the opportunity to capitalise on the distraction and retain the Championship.

Other media
As T-Bar, he made his video game debut as a playable character in WWE 2K22, but was also featured in the game's MyRise mode as Dominik Dijakovic. This character was only available in the MyRise mode, however, and was originally not accessible by players. WWE2K added the Dominik Dijakovic character in patch 1.12 released on May 16, 2022, thus giving Dijak two characters in the game.

Championships and accomplishments 
Chaotic Wrestling
CW Heavyweight Championship (1 time)
CW New England Championship (1 time)
CW Tag Team Championship (1 time) – with Mikey Webb
Eleventh Triple Crown Champion
Lancaster Championship Wrestling
 Keystone Cup (2015) – with J. Diesel
Pro Wrestling Illustrated
 Ranked No. 104 of the top 500 singles wrestlers in the PWI 500 in 2020
Pro Wrestling Resurgence
PWR Heavyweight Championship (1 time)
Ring of Honor 
Top Prospect Tournament (2015)
WrestleMerica
WrestleMerica Heavyweight Championship (1 time)
 WrestleCrap
 Gooker Award (2020) –

References

External links

1987 births
American male professional wrestlers
Living people
Professional wrestlers from Massachusetts
21st-century professional wrestlers